Ajnaathavasam is a 1973 Indian Malayalam film,  directed by  A. B. Raj and produced by K. P. Kottarakkara. The film stars Prem Nazir, Vijayasree, Adoor Bhasi and Jose Prakash in the lead roles. The film had musical score by M. K. Arjunan.

Cast

Prem Nazir as Ravindran
Vijayasree as Kunjulakshmi
Adoor Bhasi as Minnal
Jose Prakash as Jayaraj
Prema as Rajamma
Sankaradi as Kochuraman
Paul Vengola as Geetha's Father
C. R. Lakshmi as Ravi's mother
Manjeri Chandran as Manager
Kaduvakulam Antony as Director London
Khadeeja as Mrs. Rajeswari Simon
Kunchan as Hippy Ram Ram
N. Govindankutty as R. K. Chittoor
Paravoor Bharathan as Hotel Boy
Rani Chandra as Kamala
Sadhana as Bindu
Santo Krishnan as Jayaraj's henchman
Sankar as Madhavan
Sujatha as Geetha
V. M. K. Nair as Jayaraj's henchman

Soundtrack
The music was composed by M. K. Arjunan and the lyrics were written by Sreekumaran Thampi.

References

External links
 

1973 films
1970s Malayalam-language films